David Wisdom is a Canadian artist and former  radio personality, best known as the host of Night Lines, RadioSonic, Radio-On, and Pearls of Wisdom on CBC Radio 2. He has been called "the Canadian equivalent of John Peel".

Since his retirement in 2007, he has exhibited as a photo media artist. His photographic series from 1969 to 1979 documents the development of the city of Vancouver.

References

Living people
Year of birth missing (living people)
CBC Radio hosts
Canadian radio personalities
Canadian photographers